Hangzhou ( or , ; , ,), also romanized as Hangchow, is the capital and most populous city of Zhejiang, China. It is located in the northwestern part of the province, sitting at the head of Hangzhou Bay, which separates Shanghai and Ningbo. Hangzhou grew to prominence as the southern terminus of the Grand Canal and has been one of China's most renowned and prosperous cities for much of the last millennium. It is a major economic and e-commerce hub within China, and the second biggest city in Yangtze Delta after Shanghai. Hangzhou is classified as a sub-provincial city and forms the core of the Hangzhou metropolitan area, the fourth-largest in China after Guangzhou-Shenzhen Pearl River agglomeration, Shanghai-Suzhou-Wuxi-Changzhou conurbation and Beijing. As of 2019, the Hangzhou metropolitan area was estimated to produce a gross metropolitan product (nominal) of 3.2 trillion yuan ($486.53 billion), making it larger than the economy of Nigeria (the largest in Africa). As of the 2020 Chinese census, it had a total population of 11,936,010 inhabitants.

Hangzhou has been repeatedly rated as the best commercial city in mainland China by Forbes and the Chinese city with the highest growth potential by the Economist Intelligence Unit, and it boasts the eighth largest GDP among cities in mainland China with a GDP of around 1.8 trillion RMB ($280 billion).  Home to the headquarters of large global tech companies such as the Alibaba Group, Ant Group and NetEase, Hangzhou is known for attracting professionals and entrepreneurs who work in information technology. Since 2014, its rapid population growth has led to a steady increase in local housing prices. According to the 2020 Hurun Global Rich List, Hangzhou ranks 11th in the world and 6th in China (after Beijing, Shanghai, Hong Kong, Shenzhen and Guangzhou) in the number of resident billionaires.

Hangzhou is a major city for scientific research in the Asia-Pacific, ranking 19th globally by scientific outputs. It hosts several notable universities, including Zhejiang, Zhejiang University of Technology, Hangzhou Normal, Hangzhou Dianzi, Zhejiang A&F, Zhejiang Sci-Tech, Zhejiang Chinese Medical, Westlake, China Jiliang and Zhejiang University of Finance and Economics. In September 2015, Hangzhou was awarded the 2022 Asian Games. Its West Lake, a UNESCO World Heritage Site west of the city, is among its best-known attractions. A study conducted by PwC and China Development Research Foundation ranked Hangzhou first among "Chinese Cities of Opportunity". According to the Globalization and World Cities Research Network (GaWC), the city is classified as Beta (global second-tier) city, together with Chongqing, Nanjing and Tianjin in China. Hangzhou is also one of the world's top 100 financial centers, according to the Global Financial Centres Index. It will be the third Chinese city to host the Asian Games, after Beijing 1990 and Guangzhou 2010. Hangzhou also hosted the 11th G20 summit in 2016.

History

Early history

It was during this time that rice was first cultivated in southeast China. Excavations have established that the jade-carving Liangzhu culture (named for its type site just northwest of Hangzhou) inhabited the area immediately around the present city around five thousand years ago. The first of Hangzhou's present neighborhoods to appear in written records was Yuhang, which probably preserves an old Baiyue name.

By a longstanding convention also seen in other cities like Guangzhou and Fuzhou, the city took on the name of the area it administered and became known as Hangzhou. Hangzhou was at the southern end of China's Grand Canal which extends to Beijing. The canal evolved over centuries but reached its full length by 609.

Tang dynasty 
In the Tang dynasty, Bai Juyi, a renowned poet, was appointed governor of Hangzhou. He noticed that the farmland nearby depended on the water of West Lake, but due to negligence the old dyke had collapsed, and the lake so dried out that the local farmers were suffering from severe drought. He ordered the construction of a stronger and taller dyke, with a dam to control the flow of water, mitigating the drought problem. The livelihood of local people of Hangzhou improved over the following years. Bai Juyi used his leisure time to enjoy the West Lake, visiting it almost daily. He then had willows and other trees planted along the dyke, making it a landmark.

It is listed as one of the Seven Ancient Capitals of China. It was first the capital of the Wuyue Kingdom from 907 to 978 during the Five Dynasties and Ten Kingdoms period. Named Xifu at the time, it was one of the three great bastions of culture in southern China during the tenth century, along with Nanjing and Chengdu. Leaders of Wuyue were noted patrons of the arts, particularly of Buddhist temple architecture and artwork. The dyke built to protect the city by KingQian Liu gave the Qiantang its modern name. Hangzhou also became a cosmopolitan center, drawing scholars from throughout China and conducting diplomacy with neighboring Chinese states, and also with Japan, Goryeo, and the Khitan Liao dynasty.

Song dynasty 
The lake is surrounded by hills on the northern and western sides. The Baochu Pagoda sits on the Baoshi Hill to the north of the lake.

Hangzhou was chosen as the new capital of the Southern Song dynasty in 1132, when most of northern China had been conquered by the Jurchens in the Jin–Song wars. The surviving imperial family had retreated south from its original capital in Kaifeng after it was captured by the Jurchens in the Jingkang Incident of 1127. Emperor Gaozong moved to Nanjing, then to modern Shangqiu, then to Yangzhou in 1128, and finally to Hangzhou in 1129. 

Once the prospect of retaking northern China had diminished, buildings in Hangzhou were extended and renovated to become a permanent imperial capital. The imperial palace in Hangzhou, modest in size, was expanded in 1133 with new roofed alleyways, and in 1148 with an extension of the palace walls. The city walls were built with tamped earth and stone and was 30 feet high and 10 feet thick at its base. There were 13 gates and several towers on the walls. The walls covered the city by four miles north to south and only one mile east to west. According to the Italian explorer Odoric of Pordenone, Hangzhou was the greatest city in the world. It was heavily populated and filled with large family estates. It had 12,000 bridges. Bread, pork, rice, and wine were abundant despite the large population. Arab merchants lived in Hangzhou during the Song dynasty, due to the fact that the oceangoing trade passages took precedence over land trade during this time. The Phoenix Mosque was constructed by a Persian settler in Hangzhou at this time.

From 1132 until the Mongol invasion of 1276, Hangzhou remained the capital of the Southern Song dynasty and was known as Lin'an. It served as the seat of the imperial government, a center of trade and entertainment, and the nexus of the main branches of the civil service. During that time the city was a gravitational center of Chinese civilization as what used to be considered "central China" in the north was taken by the Jin, an ethnic minority dynasty ruled by Jurchens.

Numerous philosophers, politicians, and men of literature, including some of the most celebrated poets in Chinese history such as Su Shi, Lu You, and Xin Qiji came here to live and die. Hangzhou is also the birthplace and final resting place of the scientist Shen Kuo (1031–1095 AD), his tomb being located in the Yuhang district.

During the Southern Song dynasty, commercial expansion, an influx of refugees from the conquered north, and the growth of the official and military establishments, led to a corresponding population increase and the city developed well outside its 9th-century ramparts. According to the Encyclopædia Britannica, Hangzhou had a population of over 2 million at that time, while historian Jacques Gernet has estimated that the population of Hangzhou numbered well over one million by 1276. (Official Chinese census figures from the year 1270 listed some 186,330 families in residence and probably failed to count non-residents and soldiers.) It is believed that Hangzhou was the largest city in the world from 1180 to 1315 and from 1348 to 1358.

Because of the large population and densely crowded (often multi-story) wooden buildings, Hangzhou was particularly vulnerable to fires. Major conflagrations destroyed large sections of the city in 1208, 1229, 1237, and 1275. The 1237 fire alone destroyed 30,000 dwellings. However, the worst was the 1208 fire which burned for 4 days in a 3-mile diameter and burnt 58,097 houses as well as killing 59 people. To combat this threat, the city constructed storage buildings that were rented out to merchants where watchmen patrolled by night and was enclosed by water on all sides. Besides this, the government established an elaborate system for fighting fires, erected watchtowers, devised a system of lantern and flag signals to identify the source of the flames and direct the response, and charged more than 3,000 soldiers with the task of putting out fire.

Yuan dynasty 
Hangzhou was besieged and captured by the advancing Mongol armies of Kublai Khan in 1276, three years before the final collapse of the Southern Song. Historian Patricia Buckley Ebrey noted that the Mongol Yuan dynasty killed the Jurchen Wanyan royal family by the hundreds in the Mongol siege of Kaifeng, while sparing the city of Hangzhou including the Chinese Zhao royal family of the Southern Song. The Mongols rehired Southern Song government officials and had Han Chinese artisans in Shangdu marry the palace women. The capital of the new Yuan dynasty was established in the city of Dadu (Beijing), but Hangzhou remained an important commercial and administrative center for their southern territory.

Foreign descriptions 
Yuan China was very open to foreign visitors, and several returned west describing Hangzhou—under the names Khinzai, Campsay, etc.as one of the foremost cities in the world. The Venetian merchant Marco Polo supposedly visited Hangzhou in the late 13th century. In his book, he records that the city was "greater than any in the world" and that "the number and wealth of the merchants, and the amount of goods that passed through their hands, was so enormous that no man could form a just estimate thereof." Polo's account greatly exaggerates the city's size, although it has been argued that the "hundred miles" of walls would be plausible if Chinese miles were intended instead of Italian ones and that the "12,000 stone bridges" might have been a copyist error born from the city's 12 gates. In the 14th century, the Moroccan traveler Ibn Battuta arrived; his later account concurred that al-Khansā was "the biggest city I have ever seen on the face of the earth." He visited Hangzhou in 1345 and noted its charm and described how the city sat on a beautiful lake and was surrounded by gentle green hills. He was particularly impressed by the large number of well-crafted and well-painted Chinese wooden ships with colored sails and silk awnings in the canals. He attended a banquet held by Qurtai, the Yuan Mongol administrator of the city, who according to Ibn Battuta, was fond of the skills of local Chinese conjurers.

Modern history

The city remained an important port until the middle of the Ming dynasty era, when its harbor slowly silted up. Under the Qing, it was the site of an imperial army garrison.

In 1856 and 1860, the Taiping Heavenly Kingdom occupied Hangzhou. The city was heavily damaged during its conquest, occupation, and eventual reconquest by the Qing army.

Hangzhou was ruled by the Republic of China government under the Kuomintang from 1927 to 1937. From 1937 to 1945, the city was occupied by Japan. The Kuomintang returned in 1945, and governed until 1949. On May 3, 1949, the People's Liberation Army entered Hangzhou and the city came under Chinese Communist Party (CCP) control. After Deng Xiaoping's reformist policies began in the end of 1978, Hangzhou took advantage of being situated in the Yangtze Delta to bolster its development. It is now one of China's most prosperous major cities.

During the Cultural Revolution, Hangzhou was stage to a series of labor unrest and factional fighting known as the Hangzhou incident.

In September 2015, Hangzhou was awarded the 2022 Asian Games. It will be the third city in China to host the Asian Games after Beijing 1990 and Guangzhou 2010. It also hosted the eleventh G20 summit in 2016.

In February 2020, the city was under curfew measures due to the outbreak of coronavirus beginning in Wuhan that spread across China.

Geography 

Hangzhou is located in northwestern Zhejiang province, at the southern end of the Grand Canal of China, which runs to Beijing, in the south-central portion of the Yangtze River Delta. Its administrative area (sub-provincial city) extends west to the mountainous parts of Anhui province, and east to the coastal plain near Hangzhou Bay. The city center is built around the eastern and northern sides of the West Lake, just north of the Qiantang River.

Climate 

Hangzhou's climate is humid subtropical (Köppen Cfa) with four distinctive seasons, characterised by long, very hot, humid summers and chilly, cloudy and drier winters (with occasional snow). In late summer (August to September), Hangzhou suffers typhoon storms, but typhoons seldom strike it directly. Generally they make landfall along the southern coast of Zhejiang, and affect the area with strong winds and stormy rains. With monthly percent possible sunshine ranging from 30% in March to 51% in August, the city receives 1,709.4 hours of sunshine annually.

Demographics

Demographics

Hangzhou is a city in China and had a population of 5,162,039 (including Xiaoshan and Yuhang) at the 2010 census, an increase of 4.8% per year since the 2000 census. The most recent estimates of the city's urban area population are between 6,658,000 and 6,820,000.

Hangzhou prefecture had a registered population of 9,018,000 in 2015. The entire province had a population of 8,700,373, and the encompassing urban agglomeration (including Shaoxing) is estimated to have population of 8,450,000.

The encompassing metropolitan area was estimated by the OECD (Organisation for Economic Co-operation and Development) to have, a population of 13.4 million, although other sources put the figure at over 21 million. The Hangzhou metropolitan area includes the major cities of Shaoxing, Jiaxing and Huzhou.

The population of Hangzhou is likely influenced by Zhejiang being chosen for model common prosperity drive.

Politics

Structure

Administrative divisions 
Hangzhou is classified as a sub-provincial city and forms the core of the Hangzhou metropolitan area, the fourth-largest in China. It is the capital and most populous city of Zhejiang Province in East China. Hangzhou comprises 10 districts, 1 county-level city, and 2 counties. The ten urban districts occupy   and have a population of 8,241,000, in which there are six central urban districts and four suburban districts. The central urban districts occupy  and have a population of 3,780,000 and the suburban districts occupy  and have a population of 4,461,000.

In the early 90s, the urban districts of Hangzhou only comprises Shangcheng, Xiacheng, Gongshu, Jianggan.

On December 11, 1996, Binjiang District was established. On March 12, 2001, Xiaoshan and Yuhang, formerly two county-level cities under the administration of Hangzhou prefecture-level city, were re-organized as two districts. On December 13, 2014, and in July 2017, Fuyang and Lin'an, formerly two county-level cities under the administration of Hangzhou prefecture-level city, were re-organized as two districts. On April 9, 2021, Linping District and Qiantang District was established.

Economy

Hangzhou's economy has rapidly developed since its opening up in 1992. It is an industrial city with many diverse sectors such as light industry, agriculture, and textiles. It is considered an important manufacturing base and logistics hub for coastal China. Additionally, the city is an e-commerce and technology hub. The 2001 GDP of Hangzhou was RMB 156.8 billion, which ranked second among all of the provincial capitals after Guangzhou. The city has more than tripled its GDP since then, increasing from RMB 156.8 billion in 2001 to RMB 1.3509 trillion in 2018 and GDP per capita increasing from US$3,020 to $21,184. As of 2019, the Hangzhou metropolitan area was estimated to produce a gross metropolitan product (nominal) of 3.2 trillion yuan ($486.53 billion), making it larger than the economies of Argentina, with a GDP of $452 billion (the 26th biggest in the World) and Nigeria with a GDP of $448 billion (the largest in Africa).

A study conducted by PwC and China Development Research Foundation saw Hangzhou ranked first among "Chinese Cities of Opportunity". Hangzhou is also considered a World City with a "Beta+" classification according to GaWC. Hangzhou ranked 89 in the Global Financial Centres Index in 2018. It was also ranked first in the China Emerging City Rankings of the Economist Intelligence Unit, which assesses Chinese cities growth potential, in both 2021 and 2022. Hangzhou ranks 11th in the world and 6th in China (after Beijing, Shanghai, Hong Kong, Shenzhen and Guangzhou) in terms of the number of billionaires according to the Hurun Global Rich List 2020.

Industries 
Hangzhou is the headquarters of several technology companies including Alibaba Group, Ant Group, NetEase and HikVision. As a result of its internet industry, many programmers from other cities such as Shanghai or Beijing have come to Hangzhou. The city has developed many new industries, including medicine, information technology, heavy equipment, automotive components, household electrical appliances, electronics, telecommunication, fine chemicals, chemical fibre and food
processing.

Economic and Technological Development Zones

Hangzhou Economic and Technological Development Zone was established and approved as a national development zone by the State Council in 1993. Encouraged industries include electronic information, biological medicine, machinery and household appliances manufacturing, and food processing. Hangzhou Export Processing Zone was established on April 27, 2000, upon approval of the State Council. It was one of the first zones and the only one in Zhejiang Province to be approved by the government. It is located close to Hangzhou Xiaoshan International Airport and Hangzhou Port.

Hangzhou Hi-Tech Industrial Development Zone was set up with approval from the State Council as a state-level high-tech Industrial Development Zone in March 1991. The HHTZ is composed of three parts, with the main regions being the Zhijiang Sci-Tech Industrial Park and Xiasha Sci-Tech Industrial Park. HHTZ has become one of the most influential high-tech innovation and high-tech industry bases in Zhejiang Province. , HHTZ hosts more than 1,100 software developers and BPO enterprises. Major companies such as Motorola, Nokia and Siemens have established R&D centers in the zone. In 2011, the GDP of the zone rose by 13.1 percent, amounting to RMB 41.63 billion. This accounted for 5.9 percent of Hangzhou's total GDP. The HHTZ positions itself as the "Silicon Valley" of China. The Alibaba Group is headquartered in the zone.

Tourism

Although Hangzhou has been through many recent urban developments, it still retains its historical and cultural heritage and natural environment. Today, tourism remains an important factor for Hangzhou's economy. One of Hangzhou's most popular sights is West Lake, a UNESCO World Heritage Site. Adjacent to the lake is an area which includes historical pagodas, cultural sites, as well as the natural environment of the lake and hills, including Phoenix Mountain. There are two causeways across the lake.

Other places of interest
 Grand Canal, also a UNESCO World Heritage Site. The part of the Canal in Hangzhou was built in 610 AD. The core historical sites are accessible by Hangzhou Metro Line 5's The Grand Canal station or East Gongchen Bridge station.
 The residence of Hu Xueyan located on Yuanbao Street was built in 1872 by Hu Xueyan, a native of Anhui, a very successful businessman. It was restored and opened to the public in 2001.
 Xixi National Wetland Park. Fish ponds and reed beds have been restored and it is home to many types of birds. It holds a temple and several historic rural houses.
 Hangzhou Botanical Garden
 Hangzhou Zoo
 Old China Street on He Fang Street (He Fang Jie or Qing He Fang, literally 'neighbourhood along the river'), which offers various souvenirs.
 Jade Springs (Yu Quan)
 Yuefei Temple A temple constructed during the Song Dynasty in 1221 to commemorate Yue Fei, which is located near the West Lake. 
 West Lake Cultural Square is one of the tallest buildings in the city centre (about ) and houses the Zhejiang Natural History Museum and Zhejiang Museum of Science and Technology.
Qiandao Lake is a man-made lake with the largest number of islands in Chun'an County, under administration of the Hangzhou prefecture-level city. These islands are different in size and shape, and have distinctive scene.
Longjing tea fields, west of the lake.
Qiantang River is the largest river in Zhejiang Province, China. Every year during August 15 to August 18 of the lunar month in China, the Qiantang Tide occurs. It is called "the Biggest Tide in the World"
In March 2013 the Hangzhou Tourism Commission started an online campaign via Facebook, the 'Modern Marco Polo' campaign. Over the next year nearly 26,000 participants applied from around the globe, in the hopes of becoming Hangzhou's first foreign tourism ambassador. In a press conference in Hangzhou on 20 May 2014, Liam Bates was announced as the successful winner and won a $55,000 contract, being the first foreigner ever to be appointed by China's government in such an official role.

Religion

Scenic places near West Lake
 Jingci Temple is located just south of West Lake.
This is believed to be the oldest Buddhist temple in the city, which has gone through numerous destruction and reconstruction cycles.
 Baochu Pagoda is located just north of West Lake on Precious Stone Hill
 Yue-Wang Temple (King Yue's Temple) or Yue Fei Miao is on the northwest shore of West Lake. It was originally constructed in 1221 in memory of General Yue Fei, who died due to political persecution.
 Leifeng Pagoda, located on Sunset Hill south of West Lake.

Other religious buildings
 Liuhe Pagoda or six harmonies pagoda is located on Yuelun Hill on the north bank of Qiantang River
 Confucius Temple
 Chenghuangmiao (City God Pavilion) located on Wushan (Wu Hill)
 Dreaming of the Tiger Spring
 The Immaculate Conception Cathedral of Hangzhou is one of the oldest Catholic churches in China, dating back 400 years to the Ming dynasty.
 Fenghuang Mosque is one of the oldest mosques in China, the current construction at the intersection of Xihu Avenue and the Central Zhongshan Road dates back 700 years to the Yuan dynasty.
 Hupao Temple

Islam
In 1848, during the Qing dynasty, Hangzhou was described as the "stronghold" of Islam in China, the city containing several mosques with Arabic inscriptions. A Hui from Ningbo also told an Englishman that Hangzhou was the "stronghold" of Islam in Zhejiang province, containing multiple mosques, compared to his small congregation of around 30 families in Ningbo for his mosque. Within the city of Hangzhou are two notable mosques: New Hangzhou Great Mosque and the Phoenix Mosque.

Judaism
As late as the latter part of the 16th and early 17th centuries, the city was an important center of Chinese Jewry, and may have been the original home of the Kaifeng Jewish community.

There was formerly a Jewish synagogue in Ningbo, as well as one in Hangzhou, but no traces of them are now discoverable, and the only Jews known to exist in China were in Kaifeng.

Christianity
Two of the Three Pillars of Chinese Catholicism were from Hangzhou. There was persecution of Christians in the early 21st century in the city.

Culture

The native residents of Hangzhou, including those of Zhejiang and southern Jiangsu, speak the Hangzhou dialect, a Wu dialect unique to the area. Hangzhou's dialect differs from those of regions in southern Zhejiang and southern Jiangsu. As the official language defined by China's central government, Mandarin is the dominant spoken language, though it is mutually unintelligible with the Hangzhou dialect. The Hangzhou dialect has an estimated total of 1.2 to 1.5 million speakers. 

There are several notable museums located in Hangzhou including China National Silk Museum, the largest silk museum in the world, China National Tea Museum, and Zhejiang Provincial Museum, which has a collection of integrated human studies, exhibition and research with over 100,000 collected cultural relics.

Many theaters in Hangzhou host opera shows such as Yue opera. There are several big shows themed with the history and culture of Hangzhou like Impression West Lake and the Romance of Song Dynasty.

Hangzhou is home to the China Academy of Art and prominent painters such as Lin Fengmian and Fang Ganmin.

The local government of Hangzhou heavily invests in promoting tourism and the arts, with emphasis placed upon silk production, umbrellas, and Chinese hand-held folding fans.

Cuisine 

Hangzhou's local cuisine is often considered to be representative of Zhejiang provincial cuisine, which is claimed as one of China's eight fundamental cuisines. The locally accepted consensus among Hangzhou's natives defines dishes prepared in this style to be "fresh, tender, soft, and smooth, with a mellow fragrance." 

Generally, Hangzhou's cuisines tend to be sweeter rather than savoury. The local people enjoy a light diet incorporating river fishes from the Yangtze River. There are historical stories revolving around the origins of local dishes.

Dishes such as Pian Er Chuan Noodles, West Lake Vinegar Fish, Dongpo Pork, Longjing Shrimp, Beggar's Chicken, Steamed Rice and Pork Wrapped by Lotus Leaves(), Braised Bamboo Shoots, Lotus Root Pudding and Sister Song's Fish Soup are some of the better-known examples of Hangzhou's regional cuisine.

 restaurants in Hangzhou include Xin Feng restaurant, Zhi Wei Guan, Grandma's Home, Green Tea Restaurant, etc. These restaurants combine the advanced food and dishes of the traditional Hangzhou cuisine .
 
Longjing tea is the most famous green tea and rank first among top ten famous teas in China. Those planted by the West Lake is the best Longjing tea. Tea is an important part of Hangzhou's economy and culture. Hangzhou is best known for originating Longjing, a notable variety of green tea. Known as the best type of Long Jing tea, Xi Hu Long Jing is grown in Longjing village.

Transportation

Port
The Port of Hangzhou is a small river port with a cargo throughput that exceeds 100 million tons annually.

Air

Hangzhou is served by the Hangzhou Xiaoshan International Airport, which provides direct service to many international destinations such as Thailand, Japan, South Korea, Malaysia, Vietnam, Singapore, Netherlands, Qatar, Portugal and the United States, as well as regional routes to Hong Kong, Taiwan, and Macau. It has an extensive domestic route network within the PRC and is consistently ranked top 10 in passenger traffic among Chinese airports.

Railway

Hangzhou sits on the intersecting point of some of the busiest rail corridors in China. The city's main station is Hangzhou East station (colloquially "East Station" ). It is one of the biggest rail traffic hubs in China, consisting of 15 platforms that house the High Speed services to Shanghai, Nanjing, Changsha, Ningbo, and beyond. The metro station beneath the rail complex building is a stop along the Hangzhou Metro Line 1 and Line 4. There are frequent departures for Shanghai with approximately 20-minute headways from 6:00 to 21:00. Non-stop CRH high-speed service between Hangzhou and Shanghai takes 50 minutes and leaves every hour (excluding a few early morning/late night departures) from both directions. Other CRH high-speed trains that stop at one or more stations along the route complete the trip in 59 to 75 minutes. Most other major cities in China can also be reached by direct train service from Hangzhou. The Hangzhou railway station (colloquially the "City Station" ) was closed for renovation in mid 2013 but has recently opened again.

A second high-speed rail channel through Hangzhou is operational along with another major station, Hangzhou West, opened on September 22, 2022.

Direct trains link Hangzhou with more than 50 main cities, including 12 daily services to Beijing and more than 100 daily services to Shanghai; they reach as far as Ürümqi. The China Railway High-Speed service inaugurated on October 26, 2010.

Coach

Central (to the east of the city centre, taking the place of the former east station), north, south, and west long-distance coach stations offer frequent coach service to nearby cities/towns within Zhejiang province, as well as surrounding provinces.

Bus

Hangzhou has a bus network consisting of a fleet of diesel, hybrid and electric buses, as well as trolleybuses. Hangzhou was once known for its extensive bus rapid transit network expanding from downtown to many suburban areas through dedicated bus lanes on some of the busiest streets in the city. However, as of mid-2021, all but one BRT routes and feeding routes had closed or been transformed to regular routes. Only route B1 is still in operation.

Cycle hire 
Bicycles and electric scooters are very popular, and major streets have dedicated bike lanes throughout the city. Hangzhou has an extensive  public bike rental system called the Hangzhou Public Bicycle system. There is a dock-and-station system like those of Paris or London and users can hire bicycles with IC card or mobile phone application. Journeys within 60 minutes are free of charge.

Metro 
Hangzhou Metro has a network of 323 km as of mid-2021, not including the Hangzhou-Haining Intercity Railway which has a length of 46 km. Major expansion plans continue. It is the 17th city in China to have a rapid rail transit system. In 2018, the State Council approved the planning for 15 metro lines, including extensions to the three existing lines, scheduled to open in time for the 2022 Asian Games.

The construction of the Metro started in March 2006, and Line 1 opened on November 24, 2012. Line 1 connects city centre with suburbs. It run from Xianghu to Wenze Road with a branch to Lingping, which would later become part of Line 9. By June 2015, the southeast section of Line 2 (starts in Xiaoshan District, ends to the south of the city centre) and a short part of Line 4 (fewer than 10 stations, connecting Line 1 and Line 2) were completed. The system is expected to have 15 lines upon completion; most lines are still under construction. The extensions of Line 2 (city centre and northwest Hangzhou) and Line 4 (east of Binjiang District)  opened in 2018. Line 5/6/7/8 opened their first parts in 2019 and 2020.

Taxis

Taxis are also popular in the city, with the newest line of Hyundai Sonatas and Volkswagen Passats, and tight regulations. In early 2011, 30 electric taxis were deployed in Hangzhou; 15 were Zotye Langyues and the other 15 were Haima Freemas. In April, however, one Zoyte Langyue caught fire, and all of the electric taxis were taken off the roads later that day. The city still intends to have a fleet of 200 electric taxis by the end of 2011. In 2014, a large number of new electric taxis produced by Xihu-BYD (Xihu (westlake) is a local company which produced televisions in the past) were deployed.

Education and Research

Universities
Hangzhou hosts many universities, most notably the Zhejiang University, one of the world's top 100th comprehensive public research universities. Hangzhou has a large student population, with college towns such as Xiasha, located near the east end of the city, and Xiaoheshan, located near the west end of the city. Universities in Hangzhou include:

 China Academy of Art (1928)
 China Jiliang University
 Hangzhou Dianzi University
 Hangzhou Normal University (1908)
 Westlake University (2018)
 Zhejiang Chinese Medical University
 Zhejiang Forestry University
 Zhejiang Gongshang University (1911, China's first business school in China)
 Zhejiang International Studies University (1955, also known as Zhejiang Education Institute)
 Zhejiang Sci-Tech University
 Zhejiang University (1897), one of the top universities in China.
 Zhejiang University City College
 Zhejiang University of Science and Technology
 Zhejiang University of Media and Communications (1984)
 Zhejiang University of Technology (1953)

Primary and secondary schools
Provincial key Public high schools in Hangzhou include Hangzhou No. 4 High School, Hangzhou No. 14 High School, Hangzhou NO.2 High School, Hangzhou Foreign Language School, High School Attached to Zhejiang University, High School attached to Hangzhou Normal university, Hangzhou No. 1 High School and Hangzhou Xuejun High School.

Private high schools in Hangzhou include Hangzhou Green Town Yuhua School, Hangzhou Chinese International School, Hangzhou International School and Hangzhou Japanese School (nihonjin gakkō).

Research 
Hangzhou is a major city for scientific research in China, ranking 9th in Asia-Oceania region and 19th globally by the Nature Index as of 2022.

Twin towns – sister cities
Hangzhou is twinned with:

Ancient proverbs about Hangzhou 
An ancient Chinese proverb about Hangzhou and Suzhou is:

Paradise above, Suzhou and Hangzhou below.

This phrase has a similar meaning to the English phrases "Heaven on Earth". Marco Polo in his accounts described Suzhou as "the city of the earth" while Hangzhou is "the city of heaven".  The city presented itself as "Paradise on Earth" during the G20 summit held in the city in 2016.

Another saying about Hangzhou is:

Be born in Suzhou, live in Hangzhou, eat in Guangzhou, die in Liuzhou.

The meaning here lies in the fact that Suzhou was renowned for its beautiful and highly civilized and educated citizens, Hangzhou for its scenery, Guangzhou for its food, and Liuzhou (of Guangxi) for its wooden coffins which supposedly halted the decay of the body (likely made from the camphor tree).

Notable residents
 Jack Ma: Co-founder and executive chairman of the Alibaba Group.
 Zong Qinghou: Entrepreneur, founder, chairman and CEO of the Hangzhou Wahaha Group.
 Sun Yang: Olympic gold medalist and competitive swimmer.
 Ye Shiwen: Olympic gold medalist and competitive swimmer.
 Wu Yibing: World No.1 in the ITF juniors ranking and professional tennis player.
 Li Wenhan: Singer, actor, member of boy groups UNIQ and UNINE.
 Yuan Li: Actress.
 Hu Yitian: Actor.
 Wang Yiren: Singer and member of Everglow.

See also

 Historical capitals of China
 Jiangnan
 List of cities in the People's Republic of China by population
 Suzhou numerals – in the Unicode standard version 3.0, these characters are incorrectly named Hangzhou style numerals

Explanatory notes

References

Citations

Sources 
 General

 
 
 
 
 
 
 
 
 
 Economic profile for Hangzhou at HKTDC

Further reading

External links

 Hangzhou Government website
 Arts Crafts Museum Hangzhou in Google Cultural Institute
 EN.GOTOHZ.COM  – The Official Website of Hangzhou Tourism Commission
 TRAVELWESTLAKE  – The Official Travel Guide of Hangzhou
 TRAVELZHEJIANG – The Official Travel Guide of Zhejiang Province
 

 
Cities in Zhejiang
Jiangnan
National Forest Cities in China
Populated places established in the 3rd century BC
Provincial capitals in China
Sub-provincial cities in the People's Republic of China
Yangtze River Delta
Prefecture-level divisions of Zhejiang